Cyclopsetta is a genus of large-tooth flounders native to the coastal waters of the Americas.

Species
There are currently four recognized species in this genus:
 Cyclopsetta chittendeni B. A. Bean, 1895 (Mexican flounder)
 Cyclopsetta fimbriata (Goode & T. H. Bean, 1885) (Spotfin flounder)
 Cyclopsetta panamensis (Steindachner, 1876) (God's flounder)
 Cyclopsetta querna (D. S. Jordan & Bollman, 1890) (Toothed flounder)

References

Paralichthyidae
Taxa named by Theodore Gill
Marine fish genera